Verres corticicola is a beetle of the Family Passalidae.

Passalidae